Samal-e Shomali (also Romanized as Samal-e Shomālī; also known as Samal) is a village in Ahram Rural District, in the Central District of Tangestan County, Bushehr Province, Iran. At the 2006 census, its population was 829, in 207 families.

References 

Populated places in Tangestan County